Baad may refer to:

Places
 Baad, Austria, small commune in Austria
 Baad, Dharwad, village in Dharwad district, Karnataka, India
 Baad, Uttara Kannada, village in Uttara Kannada district, Karnataka, India

Others
 Baad (practice) Afghan/Pashtun child marriage custom
 Baad (band) Japanese rock band
 BAAD!, a performing arts venue in New York City